The Huntington Blue Sox were a Mountain States League (1911-1912) and Ohio State League (1913-1914, 1916) minor league baseball team that played during the early 1900s. They were based in Huntington, West Virginia. Players of note include Ernie Alten, Bill Cramer, Lee Fohl, Al Mamaux, Ralph Shafer, Skeeter Shelton, Johnny Siegle, and Dan Tipple. Managers included Ezra Midkiff, Shelton, and Siegle, among others. They were the last team to be based in Huntington until the Huntington Boosters were formed in 1931.

References

Defunct minor league baseball teams
Baseball teams established in 1910
Baseball teams disestablished in 1916
1910 establishments in West Virginia
1916 disestablishments in West Virginia
Professional baseball teams in West Virginia
Sports in Huntington, West Virginia
Ohio State League teams
Mountain States League teams
Virginia Valley League teams
Defunct baseball teams in West Virginia